The Cathedral of Saint Patrick in Norwich is a cathedral of the Roman Catholic Church located in Norwich, Connecticut.  It is the mother church of the Diocese of Norwich and is the seat of its prelate bishop.

Parish history

In 1833, Father James Fitton celebrated the first Catholic mass in Norwich in a third floor loft with 12 people in attendance. By 1842, the first building in town to serve as a church was a shed in Twomeytown. A year later, Norwich became the jurisdiction of the newly erected Diocese of Hartford. St. Mary, the first Roman-Catholic church in Greeneville, was dedicated in March 1845. It was enlarged in 1858.

St. Mary's parish continued to grow into the late 1860s, when Father James Mullen recognized that a new church was needed to address the overcrowding. A site was chosen not far from the wealthy homes where so many of the Irish worked as servants. Architect James Murphy of Providence, Rhode Island, was selected to design the building. "On the morning of Good Friday in 1873, the Irish marched from Greeneville with picks and shovels and dug the foundation of the church by hand."

The cornerstone of the church was laid on July 13, 1873; parishioners paid ten cents a week to finance the construction. St. Patrick's parish was incorporated in 1878. The formal opening and dedication for the new church was held on September 28, 1879. St. Mary's church was closed later that year. St. Patrick's sustained some damage during the 1938 New England hurricane.

In 1953, the Diocese of Norwich was created as a suffragan to the Archdiocese of Hartford, and St. Patrick's Church became the cathedral for the new diocese. The Most Reverend Bernard J. Flanagan, then Chancellor of the Diocese of Burlington, Vermont, was appointed the first Bishop of Norwich by Pope Pius XII. He was installed on December 9, 1953.

See also
List of Catholic cathedrals in the United States

References

External links

Official Cathedral Site 
Diocese of Norwich Official Site

Patrick Norwich
Buildings and structures in Norwich, Connecticut
Roman Catholic Diocese of Norwich
Churches in New London County, Connecticut
James Murphy (architect) buildings
Roman Catholic churches completed in 1879
19th-century Roman Catholic church buildings in the United States
Churches on the National Register of Historic Places in Connecticut
Historic district contributing properties in Connecticut
National Register of Historic Places in New London County, Connecticut
1879 establishments in Connecticut